Vadakkan Koyikkal temple a famous devi temple or bhagavathi temple near Kayamkulam, situated in Puthiyavila village.

Sree Parvathy Devi is mainly worshiped in the temple. The other main idols of temple are lord Shiva, Bhadrakaali and Sree dharma Shastav. Idols of Naga devada, Khandakarna, Yekshi, Yogishwara and brhma rakshas are also worshiped in temple.

The main speciality of Vadakkan Koyikkal temple is that the sreekovil or main temple is two stories. Sree Parvathy the main idol is placed in ground floor and Mahadeva ( Shiva ) is placed on first floor.

Kumbha Bharani is the main festival of temple which is celebrated on the Bharani day of Malayalam calendar month Kubham. This is believed to be the birthday of Vadakkan Koyikkal Devi.  This is a festival of 10 days with nice kettukazhcha on ninth day and tenth day.

Navaha Yekngam is the one of the celebration in vadakkan koyikkal devi temple it will be conducted for nine days in April – May months. In this nine days very good religious ceremonies (poojas) will be conducted in temple and all the nine days annadana (offering food to people) also will be there in the temple.

See also

 Temples of Kerala
 Temple festivals of Kerala

Devi temples in India
Hindu temples in Alappuzha district